Naa Girlfriend Baga Rich is a 2009 Indian Telugu-language romantic thriller film directed by M. Nagendra Kumar and starring Sivaji, Kaveri Jha and Brahmanandam. Although the film is inspired by the American film 8 Heads in a Duffel Bag (1997), it has a different storyline. The film is about the romance between a poor boy and a rich girl.

Plot 
Sanjay Sastri falls in love with NRI Sravya in Bangkok. While there, Sanjay mixes up his bag with his co-passenger Myke Tyson, whose bag contains seven heads. How Sanjay proves his innocence to Sravya's family forms the rest of the plot.

Cast 
Sivaji as Sanjay Sastri
Kaveri Jha as Sravya
Brahmanandam as Myke Tyson
Vijay as Sanjay's friend
Kamal as Sanjay's friend
Ahuti Prasad as Sravya's father
Tulasi as Sravya's mother
Babloo
Gundu Hanumantha Rao
Ramaprabha
Allari Subhashini

Production 
The film was shot in Mauritius for twenty days.

Reception 
A critic from The Times of India rated the film one out of five and opined that "The director of the film was under the impression that he can get away with a fun-centric film revolving around a 'weird' plot, but he is sadly mistaken". Jeevi from Idlebrain.com gave the same rating and wrote that "On a whole, NGFBR is a pathetically made film with unappealing content". A critic from 123Telugu also gave the same rating and stated that "The entire film in fact seems to be based on two English movies - "Transporter" and "Welcome". The Tyson character seems to have been etched from Transporter and the romance angle has definitely been copied from Welcome". A critic from Sify gave the film a verdict of "Below Average" and wrote that "The film has nothing to offer. It is neither a complete comedy entertainer nor a suspense movie nor an action film". A critic from Filmibeat said that "In total, the film is more boring and less entertaining". Deepa Garimella of Full Hyderabad criticised the film and wrote that "In case you do plan to watch this flick, please carry your own garbage bag and keep the theatre clean as no one wants to see your head rolling around".

References

External links 

2000s Telugu-language films
Films set in Bangkok
Films shot in Mauritius
Indian remakes of American films
Indian romantic thriller films